Libertadores ("Liberators") were the principal leaders of the Spanish American wars of independence from Spain and of the movement in support of Brazilian independence from Portugal. They are named that way in contrast with the Conquistadors.

They were largely local-born men of European descent (criollos), in most cases part of the bourgeoisie and with military training in the motherland, who were influenced by liberalism and led colonial subjects in their struggle for independence against the metropole.

List of libertadores

Hispanic America

Brazil
Pedro I of Brazil became known as "o Libertador" ("the Liberator)  in Brazil for his role in the country's independence. Sporadically, the term has also been applied to other figures such as José Bonifacio (known as the "patriarch for independence"), Maria Leopoldina de Austria, and Joaquim Gonçalves Ledo.

Legacy
The flags of Venezuela, Colombia and Ecuador follow Francisco de Miranda's design of 1806. Also, Bolivia was named after Símon Bolívar, who in turn was president of Colombia, Peru, Bolivia and twice of Venezuela. San Martín served as "President Protector" of Peru.

In what today is part of Mexico, Guatemala, El Salvador, Honduras, Nicaragua and Costa Rica, Iturbide, a military leader revolted against the Viceroyalty of New Spain, founded an independent nation where he ascended as Emperor Agustín I.

The names of libertadores are used all over South America to name anything from towns and places to institutions and sports clubs. Also, the most prestigious international club football competition in South America is named the Copa Libertadores in their honour.

See also

 List of national founders
 Father of the Nation
 Founding Fathers of the United States
 Statues of the Liberators

Bibliography
 Robert Harvey. Liberators: Latin America's Struggle for Independence. Woodstock, The Overlook Press, 2000. 
 James Higgins (editor). The Emancipation of Peru: British Eyewitness Accounts, 2014. Online at https://sites.google.com/site/jhemanperu
 Marion Lansing. Liberators and Heroes of South America. Boston, L. C. Page & Co., 1940.
 Irene Nicholson. The Liberators: A Study of Independence Movements in Spanish America. New York, Frederick A. Praeger, 1968.

References

External links

  "Sucre, Bolívar y San Martín" Argentine Ministry of Economy
 Copa Libertadores

History of South America
 
Age of Enlightenment